Frătăuții Vechi is a commune located in Suceava County, Bukovina, northeastern Romania. It is composed of two villages: namely Frătăuții Vechi and Măneuți.

From 1786 to 1941, Măneuți village was inhabited by the Székelys of Bukovina. During the 1780s, 16 ethnic German families settled in Frătăuții Vechi in the course of the Josephine colonization.

Late modern period history 

As it is the case of other rural settlements from the countryside of Suceava County, Frătăuții Vechi (just like Frătăuții Noi for example) was previously inhabited by a sizable German community, more specifically by Bukovina Germans during the late Modern Age up until the mid 20th century, starting as early as the Habsburg period and, later on, the Austro-Hungarian period.

Administration and local politics

Communal council 

The commune's current local council has the following political composition, according to the results of the 2020 Romanian local elections:

Natives 
 Claudiu Isopescu
 Dimitrie Isopescu
 Modest Isopescu
 Petru Luhan

Gallery

References 

Communes in Suceava County
Localities in Southern Bukovina